Potoče may refer to the following places in Slovenia:

 Potoče, Ajdovščina
 Potoče, Divača
 Potoče, Preddvor

See also
 POTOC (disambiguation)